Lacoste S.A. is a French company, founded in 1933 by tennis player René Lacoste, and entrepreneur André Gillier. It sells clothing, footwear, sportswear, eyewear, leather goods, perfume, towels and watches. The company can be recognised by its green alligator logo. René Lacoste, the company's founder, was first given the nickname "the Alligator" by the American press after he bet his team captain an alligator-skin suitcase that he would win his match. He was later redubbed "the Crocodile" by French fans because of his tenacity on the tennis court. In November 2012, Lacoste was bought outright by Swiss family-held group Maus Frères.

History
René Lacoste founded La Chemise Lacoste in 1933 with André Gillier, the owner and president of the largest French knitwear manufacturing firm at the time. They began to produce the revolutionary tennis shirt Lacoste had designed and worn on the tennis courts with the crocodile logo embroidered on the chest. The company claims this as the first example of a brand name appearing on the outside of an article of clothing. Starting in the 1950s, Izod produced clothing known as Izod Lacoste under license for sale in the U.S. This partnership ended in 1993 when Lacoste regained exclusive U.S. rights to distribute shirts under its own brand. In 1977, Le Tigre Clothing was founded in an attempt to directly compete with Lacoste in the US market, selling a similar array of clothing, but featuring a tiger in place of the signature Lacoste crocodile.

More recently, Lacoste's popularity has surged due to French designer Christophe Lemaire's work to create a more modern, upscale look. In 2005, almost 50 million Lacoste products sold in over 110 countries. Its visibility has increased due to the contracts between Lacoste and several tennis players, including former American tennis players Andy Roddick and John Isner, French veteran Richard Gasquet, and Swiss Olympic gold medalist Stanislas Wawrinka. Lacoste had also begun to increase its presence in the golf world, where noted two time Masters Tournament champion José María Olazábal and Scottish golfer Colin Montgomerie have been seen sporting Lacoste shirts in tournaments.

Bernard Lacoste became seriously ill in early 2005, which led him to transfer the presidency of Lacoste to his younger brother and closest collaborator for many years, Michel Lacoste. Bernard died in Paris on 21 March 2006.

Lacoste licenses its trademark to various companies. Until recently, Devanlay owned the exclusive worldwide clothing license, though today Lacoste Polo Shirts are also manufactured under licence in Thailand by ICC and also in China. Pentland Group has the exclusive worldwide license to produce Lacoste footwear, Coty Inc. owns the exclusive worldwide license to produce fragrance, and CEMALAC holds the license to produce Lacoste bags and small leather goods.

In June 2007, Lacoste introduced their e-commerce site for the U.S. market. In 2009, Hayden Christensen became the face of the Challenge fragrance for men. In September 2010, Christophe Lemaire stepped down and Felipe Oliveira Baptista succeeded him as the creative manager of Lacoste.

René Lacoste Foundation is a community program developed to help children be able to play sports in school. In March 2016, the company opened a new flagship store on Fashion Street in Budapest.

In 2017, tennis player Novak Djokovic was named brand ambassador and "the new crocodile" (next to Rene Lacoste) for Lacoste. This obligation includes a five-year contract as well as multiple appearances in advertising campaigns, and was extended by three years.

In September 2019, Lacoste appointed Chinese singer / actor Z.Tao as their brand spokesperson for Asia Pacific as the brand's first attempt of appointing someone for the region. In 2017, 2018, and 2019, Lacoste collaborated with Supreme to release a collection of co-branded clothing.

In 2018, Louise Trotter was appointed creative director of Lacoste. In January 2023, she left her position after a four-year tenure.

In late 2022, Lacoste signed a 15-year worldwide licensing agreement with Interparfums and the launch of a new perfume line in 2024, after wrapping up its previous relationship with Coty Inc.

Brand management
In the early 1950s, Bernard Lacoste teamed up with David Crystal, who at the time owned Izod, to produce Izod Lacoste clothing. In the 1970s and 1980s, it was extremely popular with teenagers who called the shirts simply Izod. While the union was both profitable and popular, Izod Lacoste's parent company (Crystal Brands, Inc.) was saddled with debt from other business ventures. When attempts to separate Izod and Lacoste to create revenue did not alleviate the debt, Crystal sold his half of Lacoste back to the French and Izod was sold to Van Heusen.

However, starting in 2000, with the hiring of a new fashion designer Christophe Lemaire, Lacoste began to take over control of its brand name and logo, reining in their branding arrangements. Currently, Lacoste has once again returned to the elite status it held before a brand management crisis circa 1990.

Lacoste was involved in a long-standing dispute over its logo with Hong Kong-based sportswear company Crocodile Garments. At the time, Lacoste used a crocodile logo that faced right (registered in France in 1933) while Crocodile used one that faced left (registered in various Asian countries in the 1940s and 1950s). Lacoste tried to block an application from Crocodile to register its logo in China during the 1990s, the dispute ending in a settlement. As part of the agreement, Crocodile agreed to change its logo, which now sports scalier skin, bigger eyes and a tail that rises vertically.

Sponsorships

Tennis

 Samantha Stosur (to 2012)
 Marc Polmans
 Pablo Andujar
 Roberto Bautista Agut
 Guillermo Garcia Lopez
 Albert Ramos-Viñolas
 Anett Kontaveit
 Julien Benneteau
 Jérémy Chardy
 Alizé Cornet (to 2018)
 Fiona Ferro
 Pierre-Hugues Herbert
 Ugo Humbert
 Nicolas Mahut
 Benoît Paire (to 2021)
 Arthur Rinderknech
 Hyeon Chung
 Marius Copil
 Daniil Medvedev
 Anastasia Pavlyuchenkova
 Elena Vesnina (to 2017)
 Novak Djokovic
 Filip Krajinović
 Jil Teichmann
 Latisha Chan
 Chan Hao-ching
 Pablo Cuevas
 Denis Kudla
 Christina McHale
 Bernarda Pera

Retired players

  Dominika Cibulková
  Kristie Ahn
  Martina Navratilova
  Andy Roddick

Golf 

  Adri Arnaus
  Azahara Muños
  Céline Boutier
  Camille Chevalier
  Julien Guerrier 
  Gregory Havret
  Benjamin Hébert
  Céline Herbin
  Raphael Jacquelin 
  Robin Roussel
  Antoine Rozner

Retailers

Lacoste operates a large number of Lacoste boutiques worldwide located as concessions in leading department stores and also as independent venue stores. In the United Kingdom, Lacoste is available from a variety of shops including, JD Sports, KJ Beckett and John Lewis Partnership. Likewise in the United States, the Lacoste brand can be found in stores such as Saks Fifth Avenue, Nordstrom, Lord & Taylor, Neiman Marcus, Bloomingdale's, Macy's, Belk, Halls, and other independent retailers. In Canada, Lacoste is sold at Harry Rosen, Hudson's Bay (retailer), its own boutiques, and other independent retailers. In Australia, it is sold at David Jones, and Myer.

Partnerships 
In March 2022, Lacoste partnered with Mojang Studios, or Minecraft, to create a whole new series of apparel, called Lacoste x Minecraft. The crocodile logo will go pixelated in Аits Minecraft merch line, with lots of different varieties of the crocodile on polos, hoodies, and T-shirts.

Controversies

Environmental practices
In July 2011, Lacoste, along with other major fashion and sportswear brands including Nike, Adidas and Abercrombie & Fitch, was the subject of Dirty Laundry, a report by the environmental group Greenpeace. According to the findings of the report, Lacoste was accused of working with suppliers in China which contribute to the pollution of the Yangtze and Pearl Rivers. Samples taken from one facility belonging to the Youngor Group located on the Yangtze River Delta and another belonging to the Well Dyeing Factory Ltd. located on a tributary of the Pearl River Delta revealed the presence of hazardous and persistent hormone disruptor chemicals, including alkylphenols, perfluorinated compounds and perfluorooctane sulfonate.

Censorship of Palestinian art
In December 2011, Lacoste was accused of censoring the work of Palestinian artist Larissa Sansour. Sansour had initially been included on a shortlist of eight nominees for the prestigious Lacoste Élysée prize – a competition which had been organised by the Musée de l'Élysée in Lausanne, Switzerland, with Lacoste's sponsorship. Sansour's entry into the competition was entitled "Nation Estate", which involved a series of "dystopic sci-fi images based on Palestine's admission to UNESCO". In this work Sansour imagines the state contained within a single skyscraper, with each floor representing a replica of "lost cities" including Jerusalem, Ramallah and Sansour's own hometown of Bethlehem.

A month before the selection jury was to meet to choose the winner, however, the Musée de l'Élysée informed Sansour that Lacoste had changed its mind about including her work in the competition and asked the Museum to remove her as a nominee citing her work to be "too pro-Palestinian". Sansour soon went public with her story and within 48 hours the Musée de l'Élysée came out in her support announcing, in a press release, that it had decided to suspend its relationship with Lacoste as a sponsor of this prize due to its insistence on excluding Sansour from the competition. The museum emphasized that its decision to end the competition was in line with the organisation's 25 years of commitment to artistic freedom.

Lacoste's attempt to censor Sansour's work led to widespread international negative media reports on the company's actions and renewed discussions on the role of private sector companies in art sponsorships.

Xinjiang region 
In 2020, the Australian Strategic Policy Institute accused at least 82 major brands, including Lacoste, of being connected to forced Uyghur labor in Xinjiang.

Operations in Russia 
As of 25 September 2022, Lacoste was one of 238 companies that continued to operate its business as usual in Russia, as reported by Yale CELI List of companies.

See also
 Croc O' Shirt
 Crocodile Garments
 Izod
 Izod Lacoste
 Lacoste Essential (fragrance)
 Fred Perry
 Sergio Tacchini

References

External links

Official page at Facebook
Official account at Twitter

Clothing brands of France
Companies based in Paris
Clothing companies established in 1933
Fashion accessory brands
High fashion brands
Shoe companies of France
Sporting goods manufacturers of France
Sportswear brands
Eyewear companies of France
1933 establishments in France
1950s fashion
1980s fashion
1990s fashion